The Spinoff is a New Zealand online magazine and news website that was founded in 2014. It is known for current affairs coverage, political and social analysis, and cultural commentary. It earns money through commercial sponsorship and subscriptions. Journalist Duncan Greive is its founder, publisher and chief executive officer. The business is owned by Grieve and his wife Nicola, a lawyer at the Serious Fraud Office.

Business model and content 
The Spinoff began as a TV blog sponsored by the streaming platform Lightbox: it has expanded to a multi-platform news site that also publishes current affairs newsletters, podcasts and online video series. 'Spinoff Members', offering a range of benefits to subscribers, was launched in 2019. The Spinoff and the New Zealand Herald started sharing journalism and content in July 2020. 

“Our business model is partnership and sponsorship and we make it clear when our content is funded in that way. When our journalists are not writing for a partner, they are writing whatever they want. We give them implicit license because they know what makes good content and we know what our audience is interested in," Greive told business journalist Tash McGill.

During the COVID-19 pandemic in 2020–21, The Spinoff began working with the World Health Organisation (WHO), after a WHO communications officer saw their series of widely shared Covid-19 public health illustrations. These were part of a series of pieces explaining Covid-19, in a collaboration between cartoonist Toby Morris and the microbiologist Dr Siouxsie Wiles. The Spinoff released the pair's Covid illustrations and animations to Wikimedia Commons, where they have been picked up by public health services around the world. The illustrations have been published in te reo Māori and English by The Spinoff.

In 2019, The Spinoff received funding from Creative New Zealand to commission articles on contemporary New Zealand art and artists. The art section is edited by New Zealand critics Mark Amery and Megan Dunn.

Staff and contributors 
Some of the New Zealand journalists, staff writers, authors, political figures, academics, scientists and illustrators whose work has appeared in The Spinoff:

 Duncan Greive 
 Toby Manhire 
 Toby Morris 
 Dr Siouxsie Wiles
 Madeleine Chapman
 Steve Braunias
 Finlay Macdonald
 Charlotte Grimshaw
 Ashleigh Young
 Anjum Rahman

 Michelle Langstone
 Ranginui Walker
 Kim Workman
 Debbie Ngarewa-Packer
 Metiria Turei
 Briar Grace-Smith
 Chris Tse
 Dr Shaun Hendy 
 Samuel Te Kani

The Spinoff TV

The Spinoff TV was a television show that covered current affairs, pop culture, and media. It was created as a collaboration between The Spinoff and MediaWorks and hosted by Alex Casey and Leonie Hayden. It aired on Three, premiering on 22 June 2018. The final episode aired on 5 October 2018. Its first season had 16 episodes. It was not renewed for a second season.

References

News magazines published in New Zealand
2014 establishments in New Zealand
New Zealand news websites
New Zealand entertainment websites